Aeromachus plumbeola is a species of butterfly of the family Hesperiidae. It is found in the Philippines and south India.

References

Butterflies described in 1867
p
Butterflies of Asia
Taxa named by Baron Cajetan von Felder
Taxa named by Rudolf Felder